Crestwood High School is a public high school in Mantua, Ohio, United States.  It is the only high school in the Crestwood Local School District and since the 2021–22 school year serves students in grades 7 through 12.  Their athletic teams are known as the Red Devils.

State championships

 Boys Wrestling – 1976 
 Girls Track and Field – 2006 
 Girls Softball – 2003

Notable alumni
Bridget Franek (Class of 2006), Olympic athlete in middle-distance running
Jack Lambert, professional football player in the National Football League (NFL) and member of the Pro Football Hall of Fame
Xan Phillips (Class of 2010) award-winning writer and visual artist.

References

External links

High schools in Portage County, Ohio
Public high schools in Ohio